Dean Martin was the Arizona State Treasurer from 2007 to 2011. A member of the Republican Party, he defeated the Democratic Party candidate, Rano Singh, in the 2006 general election. Previously, Martin had been a member of the Arizona Senate.

Education
Martin graduated from Arizona State University with a degree in small business management and entrepreneurship.

Arizona senate
As a member of the Arizona Senate, Martin's first piece of legislation was "Chris' Law" which prevents child predators from posting bail. This bill was inspired by a 12-year-old student named Chris Cottrell. The bill became Prop 103 "Chris' Law". It passed in 2002 with 80.4% of the vote.  While in the Senate, Martin served as chairman of the senate finance committee.

Arizona treasurer
Martin was elected Arizona state treasurer in 2006 and assumed office, in January 2007. As treasurer, Martin also served as the chairman of the Board of Investment and Loan Commission, as the surveyor general and on the Land Selection Board. As treasurer, Martin was second in line of succession to the governor, since incumbent Arizona secretary of state Ken Bennett was appointed and not elected to office.

2010 gubernatorial campaign
Martin announced his bid for governor of Arizona, on January 11, 2010. Polling done on January 25, 2010, by Rasmussen Reports had Martin narrowly leading incumbent governor and fellow Republican Jan Brewer 31% to 29% in a hypothetical Republican primary.  As of March 23, 2010, Rasmussen showed Martin leading presumed Democratic nominee Arizona attorney general Terry Goddard, 43% to 38%, in a hypothetical general election match up. Martin suspended his campaign for governor, on July 9, 2010. By then Brewer had garnered national attention after signing anti- illegal immigration legislation, Senate Bill 1070.

Personal life
Martin married his wife Kerry in 1995. She died on May 25, 2009, of complications from childbirth four hours after giving birth to a son, Austin Michael Martin, who died two days later. Martin subsequently established Martin Charities to continue his wife's charitable efforts in water safety and financial literacy.

References

Living people
Year of birth missing (living people)
Politicians from Phoenix, Arizona
State treasurers of Arizona
Republican Party Arizona state senators
Ira A. Fulton Schools of Engineering alumni